The 1970–71 St. John's Redmen basketball team represented St. John's University during the 1970–71 NCAA Division I men's basketball season. The team was coached by Frank Mulzoff in his first year at the school after Lou Carnesecca left to become the head coach of the New York Nets in the American Basketball Association. St. John's home games are played at Alumni Hall and Madison Square Garden.

Roster

Schedule and results

|-
!colspan=9 style="background:#FF0000; color:#FFFFFF;"| Regular Season

|-
!colspan=9 style="background:#FF0000; color:#FFFFFF;"| NIT Tournament

References

St. John's Red Storm men's basketball seasons
St. John's
St. John's
St John
St John